Arian Kabashi (born 14 March 1997) is an Albanian professional footballer who plays as a forward for Swedish club Helsingborgs IF.

Club career

IF Elfsborg

2017 season
On 26 February 2017, Kabashi made his debut with IF Elfsborg in the 2016–17 Svenska Cupen group stage against Ytterhogdals IK after coming on as a substitute at 65th minute in place of Jesper Karlsson. Seven days later, he scored his first goal for IF Elfsborg in his second appearance for the club in a 6–1 home win over Falkenbergs FF in Svenska Cupen.

2018 season
On 3 January 2018, Kabashi signed his first professional contract with Allsvenskan side IF Elfsborg after agreeing to a two-year deal. On 8 April 2018, he played the first match as professional player in a 1–0 home defeat against Kalmar FF after coming on as a substitute at 62nd minute in place of Simon Olsson.

2019 season as loan at GAIS
On 14 January 2019, Kabashi joined Superettan side GAIS, on a season-long loan. His debut with GAIS came on 14 February in the 2018–19 Svenska Cupen group stage against Örebro SK after coming on as a substitute at 78th minute in place of Edin Hamidović.

Dalkurd FF

2020 season as loan
On 14 December 2019, Kabashi joined Superettan side Dalkurd FF, on a season-long loan and this loan would become legally effective in January 2020. His debut with Dalkurd FF came on 22 February 2020 in the 2019–20 Svenska Cupen group stage against Djurgårdens IF after being named in the starting line-up.

2021 season as a permanent player
On 20 January 2021, Kabashi signed a two-year contract with Ettan Norra club Dalkurd FF. His debut with Dalkurd FF came a day later in the 2020–21 Svenska Cupen group stage against BK Häcken after being named in the starting line-up.

Helsingborgs IF
On 6 August 2022, Kabashi signed a three-and-a-half year contract with Allsvenskan club Helsingborgs IF. His debut with Helsingborgs IF came two days later in a 5–0 away defeat against BK Häcken after coming on as a substitute at 38th minute in place of Alexander Faltsetas. Thirteen days after debut, Kabashi scored his first goal for Helsingborgs IF in his third appearance for the club in a 1–2 away win over GIF Sundsvall in Allsvenskan.

International career
Born and raised in Sweden, Kabashi is of Kosovo Albanian origin from Istog. In September 2016, Kabashi declared that he was interested in representing Kosovo. On 17 January 2017, Kabashi received a call-up from Albania U21 for a seven-day training camp in Durrës.

References

External links

1997 births
Living people
Albanian men's footballers
Swedish men's footballers
Swedish people of Kosovan descent
Swedish people of Albanian descent
Kosovan men's footballers
Association football forwards
Allsvenskan players
IF Elfsborg players
Helsingborgs IF players
Superettan players
GAIS players
Ettan Fotboll players
Dalkurd FF players